Winifred Josephine Robinson (1867-1962) was an American botanist, educator, and educational administrator.  As a botanist, she studied ferns and wrote several papers and books.  She was the first dean of the Women's College of the University of Delaware, which was founded in 1914.

Life and work 
Robinson was born and raised in Barry County, Michigan, the daughter and only child of Walter Joseph and Pamela Wheelock Robinson. She earned a B.S. in biology from the University of Michigan in 1899, where she was elected to Phi Beta Kappa. She then worked at Vassar College, where she taught in the Botany Department. Enrolling at Columbia University in she had received an M.A. by 1904 and earned her Ph.D. by 1912 after "much hard work cataloging ferns in Hawaii."

She was named the first dean of the College where she worked as an administrator, an educator and the live-in Resident Dean for the 48 female students of the first-year class. In the early 1920’s she accompanied a co-ed study abroad trip to France.  

Initially, she managed the College's only three female professors (Home Economics, Education, and Chemistry/Athletics) in addition to a secretary, a dorm matron and a security guard. 

In the College's early days, Robinson was the only woman able to cast a vote in the administrative committee of five. She retired in 1938.

Honors 

 In 1940, the college's Science Hall was renamed in her honor.
 Archives of her papers can be found at the University of Delaware.
 Inducted into the Hall of Fame of Delaware Women.

Selected written works 

Robinson, W. J. (1947). History of the Women's College of the University of Delaware, 1914-1938. University of Delaware.

References

1867 births
1962 deaths
American women botanists
19th-century American botanists
19th-century American women scientists
20th-century American botanists
20th-century American women scientists
University of Delaware faculty
Pteridologists
American women academics